Sacha Modolo (born 19 June 1987) is an Italian road racing cyclist, who currently rides for UCI ProTeam .

Career

Colnago-CSF (2010–2013)
In the spring of 2010, he sprinted his way to fourth place in the cycling monument Milan – San Remo, registering a prestigious placing. He followed the near-wins of 2010 with victories in 2011, seemingly akin to winning stages in pair in races such as the Danmark Rundt, the Tour of Qinghai Lake, the Settimana Ciclistica Lombarda and the  Giro di Padania. In 2012, as he and his teammates were competing for a spot at the start of the Giro d'Italia, Modolo won stage 6 of the Tour of Turkey with a sprint. When he crossed the line, he put his thumb in his mouth, dedicating his victory to his pregnant girlfriend.

In 2013, Modolo started the year by winning the second stage of the Tour de San Luis, beating fellow sprinter Mark Cavendish on the slightly uphill finish which featured some twist and turns. Modolo admitted after the stage that he learned about the specifics of the arrival by chatting with other riders during the race.

Lampre-Merida (2014–2017)
Modolo left  at the end of the 2013 season, and joined  for the 2014 season. In 2015, Modolo opened his account on the fifth stage of the Tour of Turkey, winning the sprint on the rising finishing straight. He banked his first two victories in a Grand Tour at the Giro d'Italia, Stages 13 and 16. He said of his victory on Stage 13 that it was his destiny to win in Jesolo since it is his home region.

EF Education First–Drapac (2018–2019)
In September 2017, it was announced that Modolo would join the  team for the 2018 season.

Major results

2004
 3rd Road race, National Junior Road Championships
2005
 7th Road race, UCI Juniors World Championships
2006
 1st Giro del Casentino
2007
 1st Trofeo Città di San Vendemiano
2008
 3rd Coppa San Geo
2009
 1st Giro del Belvedere
 1st Gran Premio della Liberazione
 3rd  Road race, UEC European Under-23 Road Championships
 3rd Trofeo Franco Balestra
 9th Trofeo Alcide Degasperi
2010
 3rd Giro del Veneto
 4th Milan–San Remo
 4th Giro del Friuli
 6th Gran Premio Città di Misano – Adriatico
 7th Dutch Food Valley Classic
2011
 1st Coppa Ugo Agostoni
 Danmark Rundt
1st Stages 1 & 4
 Tour of Qinghai Lake
1st Stages 5 & 9
 Settimana Ciclistica Lombarda
1st Stages 2 & 3
 Giro di Padania
1st Stages 1 & 3
 1st Stage 5 Brixia Tour
 2nd Overall Ronde van Drenthe
 2nd London–Surrey Cycle Classic
2012
 1st Coppa Bernocchi
 1st  Points classification Circuit de la Sarthe
 Tour of Austria
1st Stages 3 & 6
 1st Stage 6 Tour of Turkey
 Monviso-Venezia — Il Padania
1st Stages 1b (TTT) & 2
 2nd Gran Premio della Costa Etruschi
 9th Volta Limburg Classic
2013
 1st Coppa Bernocchi
 1st Memorial Marco Pantani
 Tour of Qinghai Lake
1st  Points classification
1st Stages 1, 4, 8, 9, 11 & 12
 1st Stage 2 Tour de San Luis
 2nd London–Surrey Classic
2014
 1st Trofeo Palma
 1st Trofeo Ses Salines
 Three Days of De Panne
1st  Points classification
1st Stages 2 & 3a
 1st Stage 5 Tour de Suisse
 1st Stage 5 Tour of Beijing
 1st Stage 1 Volta ao Algarve
 1st Stage 7 Tour de San Luis
 4th Trofeo Muro-Port d'Alcúdia
 8th Milan–San Remo
2015
 1st  Overall Tour of Hainan
1st Points classification
1st Stages 3 & 4
 Giro d'Italia
1st Stages 13 & 17
 1st Stage 5 Tour of Turkey
 6th Gran Piemonte
 9th Grand Prix de Fourmies
2016
 Presidential Tour of Turkey
1st Stages 4 & 7
 1st Stage 2 Czech Cycling Tour
 4th Brussels Cycling Classic
2017
 1st Grand Prix of Aargau Canton
 Tour of Croatia
1st Stages 1 & 6
 1st Stage 2 Tour de Pologne
 3rd Coppa Bernocchi
 6th Tour of Flanders
 10th Gent–Wevelgem
2018
 1st Stage 3 Vuelta a Andalucía
 7th EuroEyes Cyclassics
2021
 1st Stage 3 Tour de Luxembourg

Grand Tour general classification results timeline

References

External links

 Palmares on CyclingBase.com (French)
 

Living people
Italian male cyclists
1987 births
Cyclists at the 2012 Summer Olympics
Olympic cyclists of Italy
Presidential Cycling Tour of Turkey stage winners
People from Conegliano
Cyclists from the Province of Treviso
Italian Giro d'Italia stage winners
Tour de Suisse stage winners